Lincoln Cathedral, Lincoln Minster, or the Cathedral Church of the Blessed Virgin Mary of Lincoln and sometimes St Mary's Cathedral, in Lincoln, England, is a Grade I listed cathedral and is the seat of the Anglican Bishop of Lincoln. Construction commenced in 1072 and continued in several phases throughout the High Middle Ages. Like many of the medieval cathedrals of England, it was built in the Early Gothic style.

If so, it was the first building to hold that title after the Great Pyramid of Giza, and held it for 238 years until the spire collapsed in 1548, and was not rebuilt. Had the central spire remained intact, Lincoln Cathedral would have remained the world's tallest structure until the completion of the Washington Monument in 1884. For hundreds of years the cathedral held one of the four remaining copies of the original Magna Carta, now securely displayed in Lincoln Castle. It is highly regarded by architectural scholars; the Victorian writer John Ruskin declared: "I have always held ... that the cathedral of Lincoln is out and out the most precious piece of architecture in the British Isles and roughly speaking worth any two other cathedrals we have."

History

Remigius de Fécamp, the first Bishop of Lincoln, moved the episcopal seat (cathedra) there "some time between 1072 and 1092". About this, James Essex writes that "Remigius ... laid the foundations of his Cathedral in 1072" and "it is probable that he, being a Norman, employed Norman masons to superintend the building ... though he could not complete the whole before his death."

Before that, writes B Winkles, "It is well known that Remigius appropriated the parish church of St Mary Magdalene in Lincoln, although it is not known what use he made of it."

When Lincoln Cathedral was first built, William the Conqueror granted the parish of Welton to Remigius in order to endow six prebends which provided income to support six canons attached to the cathedral. These were subsequently confirmed by William II and Henry I.

Until then St Mary's Church in Stow was considered to be the "mother church" of Lincolnshire (although it was not a cathedral, because the seat of the diocese was at Dorchester Abbey in Dorchester-on-Thames, Oxfordshire). However, Lincoln was more central to a diocese that stretched from the Thames to the Humber.

Remigius built the first Lincoln Cathedral on the present site, finishing it in 1092 and then dying on 7 May of that year, two days before it was consecrated. In 1124, the timber roofing was destroyed in a fire. Alexander (bishop, 1123–48) rebuilt and expanded the cathedral, but it was mostly destroyed by an earthquake about forty years later, in 1185 (dated by the British Geological Survey as occurring 15 April 1185). The earthquake was one of the largest felt in the UK: it has an estimated magnitude of over 5. The damage to the cathedral is thought to have been very extensive: the cathedral is described as having "split from top to bottom"; in the current building, only the lower part of the west end and its two attached towers remain of the pre-earthquake cathedral.

Some (Kidson, 1986; Woo, 1991) have suggested that the damage to Lincoln Cathedral was probably exacerbated by poor construction or design, with the actual collapse most probably caused by a vault failure.

After the earthquake, a new bishop was appointed. He was Hugh de Burgundy of Avalon, France, who became known as St Hugh of Lincoln. He began a massive rebuilding and expansion programme. With his appointment of William de Montibus as master of the cathedral school and chancellor, Lincoln briefly became one of the leading educational centres in England, producing writers such as Samuel Presbiter and Richard of Wetheringsett, though it declined in importance after William's death in 1213. Rebuilding began with the choir (St Hugh's Choir) and the eastern transepts between 1192 and 1210. The central nave was then built in the Early English Gothic architectural style. Lincoln Cathedral soon followed other architectural advances of the time – pointed arches, flying buttresses and ribbed vaulting were added to the cathedral. This allowed support for incorporating larger windows. There are thirteen bells in the south-west tower, two in the north-west tower, and five in the central tower (including Great Tom). Accompanying the cathedral's large bell, Great Tom of Lincoln, is a quarter-hour striking clock which was installed in the early 19th century. The two large stained glass rose windows, the matching Dean's Eye and the Bishop's Eye were added to the cathedral during the late Middle Ages. The former, the Dean's Eye in the north transept dates from the 1192 rebuild begun by St Hugh, completed in 1235. The latter, the Bishop's Eye, in the south transept was reconstructed a hundred years later in 1330. A contemporary record, “The Metrical Life of St Hugh”, refers to the meaning of these two windows (one on the dark, north, side and the other on the light, south, side of the building):

"For north represents the devil, and south the Holy Spirit and it is in these directions that the two eyes look. The bishop faces the south in order to invite in and the dean the north in order to shun; the one takes care to be saved, the other takes care not to perish. With these Eyes the cathedral's face is on watch for the candelabra of Heaven and the darkness of Lethe (oblivion)."

After the additions of the Dean's eye and other major Gothic additions it is believed some mistakes in the support of the tower occurred, for in 1237 the main tower collapsed. A new tower was soon started and in 1255 the cathedral petitioned Henry III to allow them to take down part of the town wall to enlarge and expand the cathedral, including the rebuilding of the central tower and spire. They replaced the small rounded chapels (built at the time of St Hugh) with a larger east end to the cathedral. This was to handle the increasing number of pilgrims to the cathedral, who came to worship at the shrine of Hugh of Lincoln.

In 1290 Eleanor of Castile died and King Edward I of England decided to honour her, his Queen Consort, with an elegant funeral procession. After her body had been embalmed, which in the 13th century involved evisceration, Eleanor's viscera were buried in Lincoln cathedral and Edward placed a duplicate of the Westminster Abbey tomb there. The Lincoln tomb's original stone chest survives; its effigy was destroyed in the 17th century and replaced with a 19th-century copy. On the outside of Lincoln Cathedral are two prominent statues often identified as Edward and Eleanor, but these images were heavily restored in the 19th century and they were probably not originally intended to depict the couple.

The western towers and front of the cathedral were also improved and heightened. At this time, a tall lead-encased wooden spire topped the central tower but was blown down in a storm in 1548. With its spire, the tower reputedly reached a height of 525 feet (160 m) (which would have made it the world's tallest structure, surpassing the Great Pyramid of Giza, which held the record for almost 4,000 years). Although still doubted, this is the height agreed upon by the majority of historians.

Other additions to the cathedral at this time included its elaborate carved screen and the 14th-century misericords, as was the Angel Choir. For a large part of the length of the cathedral, the walls have arches in relief with a second layer in front to give the illusion of a passageway along the wall. However the illusion does not work, as the stonemason, copying techniques from France, did not make the arches the correct length needed for the illusion to be effective.

In 1398 John of Gaunt and Katherine Swynford founded a chantry in the cathedral to pray for the welfare of their souls. In the 15th century the building of the cathedral turned to chantry or memorial chapels. The chapels next to the Angel Choir were built in the Perpendicular style, with an emphasis on strong vertical lines, which survive today in the window tracery and wall panelling.

Magna Carta

Hugh of Wells, Bishop of Lincoln, was one of the signatories to Magna Carta and for hundreds of years the cathedral held one of the four remaining copies of the original, now securely displayed in Lincoln Castle.

The Lincoln Magna Carta was on display at the British Pavilion during the 1939 New York World's Fair. In March 1941, the Foreign Office proposed that the Lincoln Magna Carta be gifted to the United States, citing the "many thousands of Americans who waited in long queues to view it" and the US passage of the Lend-Lease Act, among other reasons. In 2009 the Lincoln Magna Carta was lent to the Ronald Reagan Presidential Library in Simi Valley, California.

There are three other surviving copies: two at the British Library and one at Salisbury Cathedral.

Little Saint Hugh

In August 1255 the body of an eight-year-old boy was found in a well in Lincoln. He had been missing for nearly a month. This incident became the source of a blood libel in the city, with Jews accused of his abduction, torture, and murder. Many Jews were arrested and eighteen were hanged. The boy became known as Little Saint Hugh, to distinguish him from Saint Hugh of Lincoln, but he was never canonised.

The cathedral benefited from these events because Hugh was seen as a martyr, and many devotees came to the city and cathedral to venerate him. Geoffrey Chaucer mentions the case in "The Prioress's Tale" and a ballad was written about it in 1783. In 1955 a plaque was placed near "the remains of the shrine of 'Little St Hugh in the cathedral, that decries the "Trumped up stories of 'ritual murders' of Christian boys by Jewish communities."

Features

Lincoln Imp 

One of the stone carvings within the cathedral is the Lincoln Imp. There are several variations of the legend surrounding the figure. According to 14th-century legend, two mischievous imps were sent by Satan to do evil work on Earth. After causing mayhem elsewhere in Northern England the two imps headed to Lincoln Cathedral, where they smashed tables and chairs and tripped up the bishop. An angel appeared in the Angel Choir and ordered them to stop. One of the imps sat atop a stone pillar and started throwing stones at the angel whilst the other cowered under the broken tables and chairs. The angel turned the first imp to stone, allowing the second imp to escape. The imp that turned to stone can still be found sitting atop his stone column in the Angel Choir. They also are one of the many carved animals on the structure.

Wren library 

The Wren Library houses a rare collection of over 277 manuscripts, including the text of the Venerable Bede.

Rose windows 

Lincoln Cathedral features two major rose windows, which are a highly uncommon feature among medieval architecture in England. On the north side of the cathedral is the “Dean's Eye” which survives from the original structure of the building and on the south side is the “Bishop's Eye” which was most likely rebuilt circa 1325–1350. This south window is one of the largest examples of curvilinear tracery seen in medieval architecture. Curvilinear tracery is a form of tracery where the patterns are continuous curves. This form was often done within pointed arches and squared windows because those are the easiest shapes, so the circular space of the window was a unique challenge to the designers. A solution was created that called for the circle to be divided into smaller shapes that would make it simpler to design and create. Curves were drawn within the window which created four distinct areas of the circle. This made the spaces within the circle where the tracery would go much smaller, and easier to work with. This window is also unique in that the focus of the tracery was shifted away from the centre of the circle and instead placed in other sections. The glazing of the window was difficult as the tracery for many of the same reasons; therefore, the designers cut back on the amount of iconography within the window. 

Most cathedral windows during this time displayed many colourful images of the Bible; however, at Lincoln there are very few images. Some of those images that can be seen within the window include saints Paul, Andrew, and James.

Vaults 

One major architectural features of Lincoln Cathedral are the vaults. The varying vaults within the cathedral are said to be both original and experimental. They demonstrate the experimental aspect seen at Lincoln. The vaults differ between the nave, aisles, choir, and chapels. Along the North Aisle there is a continuous ridge rib with a regular arcade that ignores the bays. In the South Aisle there is a discontinuous ridge rib that puts an emphasis on each bay. The North West Chapel has quadripartite vaults and the South Chapel has vaults that stem from one central support column. The use of sexpartite vaults allowed for more natural light to enter the cathedral through the clerestory windows, which were placed inside of each bay.

Saint Hugh's Choir exhibits a series of asymmetrical vaults that appear to almost be a diagonal line created by two ribs on one side translating into only a single rib on the other side of the vault. This pattern divides the space of the vaults and bays, placing the emphasis on the bays. 

The chapter house is a decagonal building with a single, central column from which twenty ribs rise producing unusual vaulting. 

Each area of Lincoln can be identified solely by the different vaults of the space. Each vault, or each variation of the vault, is unique. The vaults are attributed to French-Normand master mason Geoffrey de Noiers. de Noiers was succeeded by Alexander the Mason, who developed the nave's more elaborate, but symmetrical tierceron vaulting, the crossing vaulting, Galilee Porch and western facade screen.

Tower clock 

A clock by John Thwaite was installed in the north west tower in 1775. This was later improved by Benjamin Vulliamy and moved to the broad tower around 1835. It was replaced in 1880 by a new clock built by Potts and Sons of Leeds, under the instruction of Edmund Beckett QC. Cambridge Chimes were a feature of the new clock. The beat is 1.5 seconds. The striking trains require winding daily, when done manually it took 20 minutes. The going train required winding twice per week. The clock mechanism contains the inscription Quod bene vortat Deus Opt. Max., Consiliis Edmundi Beckett, Baronetti, LL.D., Opera Gul. Potts et Filiorum, civium Leodiensium, Sumptibus Decani et Capituli, Novum in Turri positum est Horologium, A.D. MDCCCLXXX.

Bells 
The South West tower of the cathedral contains a fine ring of 13 bells all cast by John Taylor and Co in Loughborough. The back 8 bells were cast in 1913, with 4 new trebles being added in 1927. In 1948 a flat 6th was added to allow for ringing on the middle 8 bells. The treble bell weighs 5cwt 0qr 2lb, with the tenor weighing 23cwt 3qr 23lb and striking the note D (nominal 600.0Hz). The bells are rung from the section of the tower just above The Great West Front, with the ringing chamber having 3 windows on all but one side. The bells themselves are hung below the louvers to minimise tower movement as much as possible.

Modern history

Wartime history 

Lincolnshire was home to many Bomber Command airfields during the Second World War, giving rise to the nickname of "Bomber County". The station badge for the nearby RAF Waddington depicts Lincoln Cathedral rising through the clouds. Until the opening of the RAF Bomber Command Memorial in 2012, the cathedral had the only memorial in the United Kingdom dedicated to Bomber Command's large losses of aircrew in the Second World War.

During the war, "priceless British treasures" were placed in a chamber sixty feet beneath the cathedral for safekeeping. This did not include the cathedral's copy of the Magna Carta as it was on loan in the United States.

21st century 

A major renovation of the West Front was undertaken in 2000. It was discovered that the flying buttresses on the east end were no longer connected to the adjoining stonework, and repairs were made to prevent collapse. Additionally, the stonework of the Dean's Eye window in the transept was crumbling, meaning that a complete reconstruction of the window has had to be carried out according to the conservation criteria set out by the International Council on Monuments and Sites. There was a period of great anxiety when it emerged that the stonework needed to shift only  for the entire window to collapse. Specialist engineers removed the window's tracery before installing a strengthened, more stable replacement. In addition to this the original stained glass was cleaned and set behind a new clear isothermal glass which offers better protection from the elements. By April 2006 the renovation project was completed at a cost of £2 million.

An announcement in January 2020 stated that since 2016, archaeologists had found over 50 burials during the renovations, including a priest buried with a chalice and paten. Among the artifacts recovered was a coin depicting Edward the Confessor who was king from 1042 to 1066. During the dig, sections of some extensively decorated Roman buildings and related artifacts were also discovered. Some of the Roman, medieval and Saxon objects were to be displayed at the visitor centre which was expected to open later in 2020. In 2022 the scaffolding of the Lincoln Cathedral was removed from its west front after 36 years.

Maintaining the cathedral costs £1.6 million a year. Between 2006 and 2009, 200,000 to 208,000 people visited Lincoln Cathedral annually. In 2010 the figure dropped to 150,000, making it the 16th-most visited attraction in the East Midlands. The fall in visitor numbers was attributed to the cancellation of the Lincoln Christmas Market that year. 

The cathedral website states; "Everyone is free to enter and gaze at the glory of the nave; you can sit in the peace of the Morning Chapel or visit the shop. If you want to explore further, we do ask you to pay." The cathedral offers tours of the cathedral, the tower and the roof. The peak of its season is the Lincoln Christmas Market, accompanied by an annual production of Handel's Messiah.

Cathedral stone 

Lincoln Cathedral is one of the few English cathedrals built from the rock it is standing on.  It is mostly built from Lincolnshire Limestone. The cathedral has owned the existing quarry, on Riseholme Road, Lincoln, since 1876. As of 2016, the quarry was expected to run out of stone in 2021. The cathedral's stonemasons use more than 100 tonnes of stone per year for maintenance and repairs.

Dean and chapter 

As of 10 December 2021:

 Dean – Christine Wilson (installed 22 October 2016)
 Precentor – Nick Brown (since December 2020 installation, also Subdean from January 2021, in addition to being Precentor)
 Chancellor – Paul Overend (since February 2018 installation)
 Vice Chancellor – Neil Burgess (temporary post to January 2022)
 Residentiary Canon – David Dadswell

Music

Choir and organists 

The choir is currently formed of adult singers (who are either lay vicars or choral scholars), and teams of about 20 girls and 20 boys. The cathedral accepted female choristers in 1995. Lincoln was the second cathedral in the country to adopt a separate girls' choir (after Salisbury Cathedral) and remains one of few which provides the same musical opportunities and equal weekly singing duties to both girls and boys. The choristers can now attend any school and are currently drawn from over ten local schools.

The Master of the Choristers (director of music) is Aric Prentice, who conducts the choir of boys and men; the Cathedral Organist and assistant director of music is Jeffrey Makinson, who conducts the choir of girls and men. The organist emeritus is Colin Walsh, previously organist and master of the choristers and then organist laureate. The assistant organist is Alana Brook.

The records of cathedral organists at Lincoln are continuous from 1439 when John Ingleton was the incumbent. Notable organists have included the Renaissance composers William Byrd and John Reading and the biographer of Mendelssohn, William Thomas Freemantle.

Organ 
One of the best examples of the work of "Father" Henry Willis, and the last he designed before his death, the cathedral organ dates from 1898. Willis had completed the design by 1885 but a shortfall in funding delayed construction and installation. This was made possible in 1898, after a donation of £1,000 from Alfred Shuttleworth, an engineer and later chairman of Clayton & Shuttleworth. This, together with other private gifts and a public subscription, allowed work to progress. On St Hugh's Day, 17 November 1898, the organ was inaugurated at a service attended by 4,700 people. Willis had intended that the organ be electrically-powered, the first organ in an English cathedral to be powered in this way. As the Brayford Wharf Power Station had not yet been completed, manual power was instead provided by infantrymen from the Lincolnshire Regiment.

The organ has been restored twice, in 1960 and in 1998. On both occasions the work was undertaken by Harrison & Harrison. It is one of only two Willis organs in English cathedrals with its original tonal scheme. The organ specification is held on the National Pipe Organ Register.

Burials 
 Remigius de Fécamp, Bishop of Lincoln (1072–92) – began the construction of Lincoln Cathedral, which was consecrated in 1092, two days after his death
 Robert Bloet, Lord Chancellor of England and Bishop of Lincoln (1093–1123)
 Robert de Chesney, Bishop of Lincoln (1148–1166?)
 Hugh of Lincoln, Bishop of Lincoln (1186–1200) and Saint (at the time of the Reformation, the best-known English saint after Thomas Becket)
 William de Blois, Bishop of Lincoln (1203–06)
 Hugh of Wells, Bishop of Lincoln (1209–35)
 Robert Grosseteste, English statesman, scholastic philosopher, theologian and Bishop of Lincoln (1235–53)
 Queen Eleanor of Castile, wife of King Edward I, died in Lincoln 1290, monumental full effigy and escutcheoned heart and viscera tomb erected in the Angel Choir
 Katherine Swynford, Duchess of Lancaster (1350–1403), wife of John of Gaunt, 1st Duke of Lancaster (son of King Edward III of England)
 Joan Beaufort, Countess of Westmorland (1379–1440), wife of Ralph Neville, 1st Earl of Westmorland, daughter of the Duke & Duchess of Lancaster
 Philip Repyngdon, Bishop of Lincoln (1405–20) and Cardinal
 John Russell, Lord Privy Seal and Lord Chancellor of England, and Bishop of Lincoln (1480–94)
 William Smyth, Bishop of Lincoln (1496–1514)
 Sir Edward Lake, 1st Baronet, (1600–1674). Born in Tetney, Lincolnshire. A Lawyer, and Royalist badly wounded at the Battle of Edgehill. Died on 18 July 1674 at Bishop Norton, Lincolnshire. Buried in the cathedral on 20 July 1674.
 John Featley
 Samuel Fuller (1635–1700) Dean of Lincoln
 William Fuller, Bishop of Lincoln (1667–75)
 Sir Richard Kaye, 6th Baronet (1736–1809) Dean of Lincoln
 William Hilton RA (1786–1839) artist
 Bishop Christopher Wordsworth (1807–1885) Bishop of Lincoln
 William John Butler, Dean of Lincoln
 The Blessed Edward King (1829–1910) Regius Professor of Pastoral Theology at Oxford, Canon of Christ Church, Bishop of Lincoln 1885–1910. Buried in the Cathedral Cloister, seated statue in bronze by Sir William Blake Richmond in Lincoln Cathedral
 Viscount Harry Crookshank

Other memorials 

 Air Vice Marshall Sir Edward Arthur Beckton Rice (d.1948)
 Rev Charles Wilmer Foster (1866-1935) historian
 Welbore MacCarthy (1840-1925), Bishop of Grantham
 Bishop Nugent Hicks (1872-1942)

In literature and media

In literature 

In Letitia Elizabeth Landon' s poetical illustration Lincoln Cathedral to a painting by Thomas Allom, she remarks on the derivation of Gothic tracery from 'the arches of the old oak trees'. This was published in Fisher's Drawing Room Scrap Book, 1837.

In media 

The cathedral was used for the filming of The Da Vinci Code (based on the book of the same name). Filming took place mainly within the cloisters, and chapter house, of the cathedral, and remained a closed set. The cathedral took on the role of Westminster Abbey, as the abbey had refused to permit filming. Although there was protest at the filming, the filming was completed by the end of August 2005. To make the Lincoln chapter house appear similar to the Westminster chapter house, murals were painted on a special layer over the existing wall, and elsewhere polystyrene replicas of Isaac Newton's tomb and other abbey monuments were set up. For a time these murals and replicas remained in the chapter house, as part of a Da Vinci Code exhibit for visitors, but in January 2008 they were all sold off in an auction to raise money for the cathedral.

The cathedral also doubled as Westminster Abbey for the film Young Victoria, filmed in September 2007, and did again in June 2018 for the Netflix Shakespeare film The King.

Gallery

See also 

 Lincoln Medieval Bishop's Palace
 Vicars' Court, Lincoln
 Architecture of the medieval cathedrals of England
 English Gothic architecture
 Gothic architecture
 Gothic cathedrals and churches
 List of Gothic Cathedrals in Europe
 List of cathedrals in England and Wales
 List of tallest church buildings
 List of tallest structures built before the 20th century
 Romanesque architecture
 List of ecclesiastical restorations and alterations by J. L. Pearson

Notes

Further reading 

 Lincoln Cathedral: Official Guide, Diocese of Lincoln
 Lincoln Cathedral, Peter B. G. Binnall, Pitkin Publishing, 
 The Grail Chronicles, E. C. Coleman, The History Press,

External links 

 
 Lincoln Cathedral Choir & Old Choristers Association
 Friends of Lincoln Cathedral
 Interactive panoramic tour of the cathedral's interior
 Capturing Lincoln Cathedral
 A history of the choristers of Lincoln Cathedral
 Conserving the Dean's Eye window, Ingenia Magazine, December 2007
 Detailed historic record for Lincoln Cathedral

 
Churches completed in 1210
Churches completed in 1311
13th-century churches in the United Kingdom
Buildings and structures in Lincoln, England
Anglican cathedrals in England
Grade I listed cathedrals
Grade I listed churches in Lincolnshire
Former world's tallest buildings
1092 establishments in England
Pre-Reformation Roman Catholic cathedrals
Diocese of Lincoln
English Gothic architecture in Lincolnshire
Churches in Lincoln, England
J. L. Pearson buildings
British military memorials and cemeteries
Basilicas (Church of England)